The Central Bank of Brazil is Brazil's central bank. It was established on Thursday, 31 December 1964, a New Year's Eve.

The bank is not linked to any ministry, currently being autonomous. Like other central banks, the Brazilian central bank is the principal monetary authority of the country.

One of the main instruments of Brazil's monetary policy is the Banco Central do Brasil's overnight rate, called the SELIC rate. It is managed by Monetary Policy Committee (COPOM) of the bank.

The bank is active in promoting financial inclusion policy and is a leading member of the Alliance for Financial Inclusion. It is also one of the original 17 regulatory institutions to make specific national commitments to financial inclusion under the Maya Declaration. during the 2011 Global Policy Forum in Mexico.

Since 25 February 2021, it is independent from Federal Government.

Independence of the Central Bank
On 3 November 2020, the bill of the Independence of Central Bank passed the Senate, by 56 votes to 12.

And on 10 February 2021, in the Chamber of Deputies was approved by 339 votes in favor and 114 against without changes, going to President Jair Bolsonaro's sanction, generating the Federal Complementary Law No. 179 of 24 February 2021.

With the Federal Complementary Law No. 179 of 24 February 2021, it became autonomous, in addition to gaining a new organizational structure.

Presidents
 
The most recent presidents of the bank have been:
 Dênio Nogueira:  – 
 Rui Leme:  –  (resign)
 Ary Burguer:  –  (acting)
 Ernane Galvêas:  – 
 Paulo Lira:  – 
 Carlos Brandão:  –  
 Ernane Galvêas:  –  
 Carlos Langoni:  –  
 Affonso Pastore:  –  
 Antônio Lemgruber:  – 
 Fernão Bracher:  –  
 Francisco Gros:  –  
 Lycio de Faria:  –  (acting)
 Fernando de Oliveira:  –  
 Elmo Camões:  –  
 Wadico Bucchi:  –  (acting)
 Ibrahim Eris:  –  
 Francisco Gros:  –  
 Gustavo Loyola:  –  
 Paulo Ximenes:  –  
 Pedro Malan:  –  
 Gustavo Franco:  –  (acting)
 Pérsio Arida:  –  
 Gustavo Loyola:  –  
 Gustavo Franco: –  
 Arminio Fraga: – 
 Henrique Meirelles:  – 
 Alexandre Tombini:  – 
 Ilan Goldfajn:  – 
 Roberto Campos Neto:  – present

See also

 Brazilian real
 Federal institutions of Brazil
 Payment system
 Real-time gross settlement

References

External links
 

Banks of Brazil
Brazil
1964 establishments in Brazil
Banks established in 1964
Executive branch of Brazil